Owen Edwards (born 21 July 1987) is a Welsh retired ice dancer who competed for Great Britain. With Louise Walden, he won gold at the 2010 Ice Challenge, 2010 International Trophy of Lyon, and 2011 British Championships. They competed in the final segment at two ISU Championships – 2011 Worlds, where they finished 20th, and 2012 Europeans, where they placed 13th.

Career 
Walden and Edwards began skating together in June 2006. They made their international debut in October 2008 at the 2008 Karl Schaefer Memorial in Vienna, Austria, where they placed 8th. Between April 2008 and September 2012, they were based at CSG Lyon International Skating Academy in France, where they were coached by Muriel Boucher-Zazoui, Romain Haguenauer and Olivier Schoenfelder. They won the British national title in the 2010–2011 season. At the 2011 World Championships in Moscow, they qualified to the final segment and finished 20th overall.

Walden/Edwards placed 13th at the 2012 European Championships in Sheffield, England. In September 2012, the duo moved to Hackensack, New Jersey, to train under Galit Chait. In May 2013, the couple took to their official website to announce their retirement from competitive skating.

Walden and Edwards were ranked 5th in the 2009/2010 UK national rankings and 2nd in 2010/2011.

Edwards works as a skating coach in the UK.

Programs 
(with Walden)

Competitive highlights 
(with Walden)

References 

 Nice October 2010
 Dortmund November 2010
 Graz November 2010
 Lyon November 2010

External links 

 
 
 Walden and Edwards: 2010–2011 schedule

British male ice dancers
Living people
Sportspeople from Wrexham
1987 births
Competitors at the 2009 Winter Universiade
Competitors at the 2011 Winter Universiade